Nompar of Caumont (1391–1446) was a Gascon lord who left written accounts of his pilgrimages to Santiago de Compostela and Jerusalem.  His work has also contributed lexicographic inputs to the Dictionary of Middle French.

Biography 
His family had long allied with the English. He had been named for his paternal grandfather, Nompar of Caumont, the King of England's seneschal of Agenais, who was appointed in April 1400 in English Gascony.

During his minority he was brought up by his cousin the count of Foix, then married young and had two sons.

He left for Compostela in July 1414, at the age of twenty-three, then for Jerusalem, between February 1419 and April 1420. He was, at that time, known as lord of Caumont, Castelnau, Castelculier and Berbiguières.

He was exiled in 1443 by Charles VII, King of France, and dispossessed of his lands in favor of his brother. He died in England three years later, leaving written accounts of his pilgrimages and a book for his children.

Voyaige d'oultremer en Jhérusalem 

His book was published for the first time in 1858. Nompar describes the meaning of his pilgrimage and how he was made a Knight of the Holy Sepulchre. He criticized the manners of his time. Particularly the lords of his time, more concerned to wage war on each other than to go crusade. He put his own banner next to that of the king of England. And the next day, he created its own order of chivalry which had, for a distinctive mark, an azure scarf.

Works 
 Dits et Enseignemens
 Voyaige a St Jaques en Compostelle, 1414  
 Voyaige d'oultremer en Jhérusalem, 1419–1420

See also 
 Duc de La Force

Notes, citations and sources

Notes

Citations

Sources

 

 

 

 

 

1391 births
1446 deaths
Deaths in England
14th-century French people
15th-century French people
Medieval Knights of the Holy Sepulchre
15th-century French writers
French Roman Catholic writers
Medieval travel writers
Holy Land travellers
Pilgrimage accounts